Burkeville can refer to:

Burkeville, Texas
Burkeville, Virginia
Burkeville, British Columbia